Liam McCullough (born June 5, 1997) is an American football long snapper for the Atlanta Falcons of the National Football League (NFL). He played college football at Ohio State and was signed as an undrafted free agent by the Las Vegas Raiders after the 2020 NFL Draft.

College career
McCullough was ranked as a twostar recruit by 247Sports.com coming out of high school. He committed to Ohio State on June 10, 2014 after Ohio State offered a full scholarship.

Professional career

Las Vegas Raiders
McCullough signed with the Las Vegas Raiders as an undrafted free agent after the 2020 NFL Draft. McCullough was released as the Raiders cut their roster to 80 players on August 3, 2020.

Pittsburgh Steelers
Seven days later, McCullough was signed by the Pittsburgh Steelers. He was released as part of final roster cuts on September 5, 2020.

Las Vegas Raiders (second stint)
On January 6, 2021, McCullough rejoined the Raiders on a reserve/future contract. He was waived on August 16, 2021.

Atlanta Falcons
On April 26, 2022, McCullough signed with the Atlanta Falcons.

He re-signed with them as an exclusive rights free agent on February 22, 2023.

References

1997 births
Living people
American football long snappers
Atlanta Falcons players
Las Vegas Raiders players
Ohio State Buckeyes football players
Pittsburgh Steelers players
Players of American football from Columbus, Ohio